Ombudsmen in Pakistan is an Ombudsman in Pakistan.

An ombudsman is an official, usually appointed by the government or by parliament but with a significant degree of independence, who is charged with representing the interests of the public by investigating and addressing complaints of maladministration or violation of rights. In some countries an Inspector General, Citizen Advocate or other official may have duties similar to those of a national ombudsman, and may also be appointed by the legislature. Below the national level an ombudsman may be appointed by a state, local or municipal government, and unofficial ombudsmen may be appointed by, or even work for, a corporation such as a utility supplier or a newspaper, for an NGO, or for a professional regulatory body.

In Pakistan, the establishment of an ombudsman institution had been advocated for some time before Article 276 of the Interim Constitution of 1972 provided for the appointment of a Federal Ombudsman and Provincial Ombudsmen. The Constitution of 1973 also provided for a Federal Ombudsman, and the institution was eventually created through the Establishment of the Office of Wafaqi Mohtasib (Ombudsman) Order, 1983 (President’s Order No. 1 of 1983), which is now a part of the Constitution of Pakistan by virtue of Article 270-A. It started functioning on 8 August 1983. The office of Ombudsman is currently held by Ejaz Ahmad Qureshi.  The Ombudsman has headquarters in Islamabad and Regional Offices in Lahore, Sukkur, Quetta, Faisalabad, Multan, Dera Ismail Khan, Peshawar, Karachi and Hyderabad

Other ombudsman agencies in Pakistan include Provincial Ombudsman (Mohtasib-e-Aala) offices in Punjab, Balochistan, Khyber Pakhtunkhwa and Sindh; a banking ombudsman, the Banking Mohtasib Pakistan; a Federal Insurance Ombudsman and a Federal Tax Ombudsman. The region of Azad Jammu and Kashmir also has an Ombudsman office. Under the Protection against Harassment of Women at Workplace Act 2010, the Federal Ombudsman Secretariat for Protection Against Harassment was established. Momal Ibrahim is currently holding the office of Federal Ombudsperson for Protection against Harassment of Women at Workplace. The Act provides for similar offices at the provincial level.

The various ombudsman agencies participate in a Forum of Pakistan Ombudsman (FPO), and the federal bodies are affiliated to the Asian Ombudsman Association (AOA) and the International Ombudsman Institute (IOI).

A further feature of the judicial system is the office of Mohtasib (Ombudsman), which is provided for in the constitution. The office of Mohtasib was established in many early Muslim states to ensure that no wrongs were done to citizens. Appointed by the president, the Mohtasib holds office for four years; the term cannot be extended or renewed. The Mohtasib's purpose is to institutionalize a system for enforcing administrative accountability, through investigating and rectifying any injustice done to a person through maladministration by a federal agency or a federal government official. The Mohtasib is empowered to award compensation to those who have suffered loss or damage as a result of maladministration. Excluded from jurisdiction, however, are personal grievances or service matters of a public servant as well as matters relating to foreign affairs, national defence, and the armed services. This institution is designed to bridge the gap between administrator and citizen, to improve administrative processes and procedures, and to help curb misuse of discretionary powers.

References